A siyum ("completion"), in Judaism, occasionally spelled siyyum, is the completion of any established unit of Torah study. The most common units are a single volume of the Talmud, or of Mishnah, but there are other units of learning that may lead to a siyum.

The typical structure of a siyum event includes a conclusion of the study, reading of the Hadran text, kaddish, and a celebratory meal.

The custom to make a siyum is first mentioned in the Talmud: "Abaye said: grant me my reward, for when I see a young Torah scholar who has completed a tractate, I make a celebration for the rabbis."

Type of study 
The typical siyum is on a single book of Talmud, or on the entirety of the Mishna. This is due to the Talmud being an explanation of the Mishna, with each tractate of the Mishnah being relatively short, but the Talmudical version of it occupying an entire book. (A single published book of Mishnah typically covers many Tractates.)

Talmud and Mishnah are organized in 6 sections (or "orders"), called sedarim in Hebrew. Sometimes, a siyum may be made on the completion of all the Mishnah of a seder, rather than the completion of all six at once. Conversely, a larger Talmudic siyum than usual may cover all Talmud in a seder, or even all of the Talmud comprising all six sedarim. Such a siyum is known as a Siyum HaShas, as HasShas an abbreviation of the Hebrew for "the six orders."

Especially starting in the 20th century, other Judaic religious topics have been used to make a siyum, though often less formal than the standard Mishnah/Talmud siyum. One of the most common is the completion of the Mishna Berurah, a detailed work of the rules Jews practice each day, each Sabbath, and relating to each festival. Young schoolchildren sometimes make a siyum on completion of one of the five books of the Torah ("Books of Moses").

Shared study 
In many cases, the unit of study is not completed by any single person. Instead, the unit is split among participants, who complete one section. Jointly, the participants complete the whole unit.

This is especially common for the completion of the entire six orders of the Mishnah after a person dies before the anniversary, and also frequently for one order of Mishnah within the month after their death.

This format is also sometimes used to complete all the Talmud, with typically a single tractate assigned to each participant (though smaller tractates may be combined or larger tractates broken down further). In especially large groups organized communally, the Talmud may be broken down to the folio level, with thousands of participants. This is sometimes called a Shas-A-Thon, as it allows the enormous body of material to be completed jointly in a short period of time, sometimes a single day.

Siyum HaShas 

An event known as a Siyum HaShas marks the completion of the entire Talmud. This is a monumental undertaking, consisting of 2,711 folios (5,422 pages) of study.

The Daf Yomi study program is the largest Siyum HaShas event, with hundreds of thousands of participants. In this program, a schedule of study includes a specific daf or blatt (folio) to be studied by all participants on any particular day. In this standard calendar, the entire Talmud is covered approximately every seven and a half years. Enormous siyum gatherings follow, arranged around the world.

The main event for the 13th Siyum HaShas, organized by Agudath Israel of America, took place on January 1, 2020, in MetLife Stadium in New Jersey with a sellout crowd of over 90,000. Other Siyum HaShas events were held globally, with several "satellite" Agidath Israel locations around the United States, and several other arranged in the United States and Israel by the Dirshu organization.

Although Siyum HaShas is most commonly associated with Daf Yomi, this is not always the case. Many serious students of the Talmud have completed it on their own schedules, either by themselves, with a partner, or a small study group. However, it is not very common, even among regular Talmudic students and researchers, and those who do so are often viewed as elites.

Another alternative form of Siyum HaShas involves the shared study method (see above).

Format 
A siyum usually includes:

 one or more participants to the study performing a reading and explanation of the last topic studied
 the same or another participant reading the lengthy Hadran prayer (which may be broken up amongst participants)
 recitation of a special version of the Kaddish; this version is the longest form of Kaddish, including the length introductory section used at burial, as well as the lengthy paragraph of Kaddish d'Rabannan
 greetings and congratulatory remarks
 a celebratory meal, or seudat mitzvah, which may also include additional speeches

The term siyum sometimes refers to the celebratory meal itself.

Common occasions 
An enduring custom is for the community to complete a unit of Torah or tractate(s) of Talmud during the 30 days following the death of a beloved one and hold a communal siyum thereafter, in tribute and honor of the memory of the deceased (see also Bereavement in Judaism).

It has become customary for synagogues to arrange a siyuum (rarely written with two u's) on the morning before Passover to allow those fasting for Ta’anit Bechorim (Fast of the Firstborn) to break their fast, taking advantage of the halakhic principle that prioritizes Torah study.

A siyum ha-sefer, meaning “completion of the book,” is also held as a ceremonial completion and dedication of a sefer Torah, a handwritten copy of the Torah, the most important Jewish ritual object, which is kept in the Ark of a synagogue. This is not technically related to the other forms of siyum.

Usually, when an individual or a group conclude the study of any tractate of the Talmud, or even of a seder of Mishnah (less commonly, of a single tractate of Mishnah), a siyum is celebrated. At the end of every volume of the Talmud a special hadran prayer is printed with a set order of prayers and a special kaddish, Kaddish D'itchadita, in honor of the completion of that volume, which Judaism considers to be an important achievement and a milestone worth celebrating.

In the merit and honor of a deceased individual, it is customary to undertake Mishnah study with the goal of holding a siyum. The entirety of the Mishnah is divided among many family members or volunteers, to be completed at shloshim or at yahrtzeit. (Sometimes, a single seder is completed for shloshim, which may also contribute simultaneously to the completion of all six for the yahrtzeit.)

Rabbi Moshe Feinstein (based on the Nemukei Yosef, the Ran, the Rashbam, and the Eliyah Rabbah) extends the concept of a siyum to include even a festive meal celebrating the completion of any mitzvah (commandment) that has taken a significant duration of time (such as a number of weeks or months). In contrast, Rabbi Osher Weiss suggested that a siyum could be done upon finishing in-depth study of a Biblical book or of a book "from the core of the Oral Torah" such as Mishnah and Gemara, but not upon finishing later works which comment on these books.

Notes

References 
Eisenberg, R.L. The JPS Guide to Jewish Traditions. The Jewish Publication Society, 2004
Donin, H.H. To be a Jew. Basic Books. 1991

Jewish law and rituals
Talmud
Hebrew words and phrases